Peter Gregg Arnett  (born 13 November 1934) is a New Zealand-born American journalist. He is known for his coverage of the Vietnam War and the Gulf War. He was awarded the 1966 Pulitzer Prize in International Reporting for his work in Vietnam from 1962 to 1965, mostly reporting for the Associated Press.

Arnett also worked for National Geographic magazine, and later for various television networks, most notably for nearly two decades at CNN.  Arnett published a memoir, Live from the Battlefield: From Vietnam to Baghdad, 35 Years in the World's War Zones (1994). In March 1997, Arnett interviewed Osama bin Laden, leader of Al-Qaeda. The journalism school at the Southern Institute of Technology in New Zealand was named for Arnett.

Early life
Arnett was born in 1934 in Riverton, in New Zealand's Southland region. His first job as a journalist was with The Southland Times.

Vietnam
During his early years in journalism, Arnett worked in Southeast Asia, largely based in Bangkok. In 1960 he started publishing a small English-language newspaper in Laos. Eventually, he made his way to Vietnam, which the French had abandoned after being defeated at Dien Bien Phu by communists from North Vietnam.

Arnett became a reporter for the Associated Press, based in Saigon in the South, in the years when the United States began to get involved in the civil conflict and through the Vietnam War. On 7 July 1963, in what became known as the Double Seven Day scuffle, he was injured in a widely reported physical altercation between a group of western journalists and South Vietnamese undercover police. The reporters were trying to cover Buddhist protests against the South Vietnamese government. His articles, such as "Death of Supply Column 21," about an event during Operation Starlite in August 1965, resulted in raising the ire of the American government, which had been increasing the number of forces in the region.

Arnett accompanied troops on dozens of missions, including the battle of Hill 875, in November 1967. An American detachment was sent to rescue another unit that was stranded in hostile territory, and the rescuers were nearly killed during the operation. In September 1972, Arnett joined a group of U.S. peace activists, including William Sloane Coffin and David Dellinger, on a trip to Hanoi, North Vietnam, to accept three American prisoners of war for return to the United States.

Arnett wrote in an unvarnished manner when reporting stories of ordinary soldiers and civilians. Arnett's writing was often criticized by administration spokesmen as negative, who wanted to keep reporting of the war positive. General William Westmoreland, President Lyndon B. Johnson and others in power put pressure on the AP to get rid of or transfer Arnett from the region.

In what is considered one of his iconic dispatches, published on 7 February 1968, Arnett wrote about the Battle of Bến Tre: "'It became necessary to destroy the town to save it,' a United States major said today. He was talking about the decision by allied commanders to bomb and shell the town regardless of civilian casualties, to rout the Vietcong." The quotation was gradually altered in subsequent publications, eventually becoming the more familiar, "We had to destroy the village in order to save it." The accuracy of the original quotation and its source have often been called into question.  Arnett never revealed his source, except to say that it was one of four officers he interviewed that day. US Army Major Phil Cannella, the senior officer present at Bến Tre, suggested the quotation might have been a distortion of something he said to Arnett. The New Republic at the time attributed the quotation to US Air Force Major Chester L. Brown. In Walter Cronkite's 1971 book, Eye on the World, Arnett reasserted the quotation was something "one American major said to me in a moment of revelation."

Arnett was one of the last western reporters remaining in Saigon after its fall and capture by the People's Army of Vietnam. Occupying soldiers showed him how they had entered the city.

Arnett wrote the 26-part mini-series documentary, Vietnam: The Ten Thousand Day War (1980), produced by Canadian Broadcasting Corporation (CBC).

Soviet invasion of Afghanistan
At the time of the Soviet Invasion of Afghanistan, Arnett was working for Parade magazine. With a contact named Healy, he entered Afghanistan illegally from Pakistan; both men were dressed in traditional clothing as natives and led by Mujahideen guides. They continued to a Jalalabad hideaway of approximately fifty rebels. The trip came to an end when Healy fell into the Kunar River, ruining the pair's cameras. Later, Arnett would recount the story to journalist Artyom Borovik, who was covering the Soviet side of the war.

Gulf War
Beginning in 1981, Arnett worked for CNN for 18 years, ending in 1999. During the Gulf War, he became a household name worldwide as the only reporter to have live coverage directly from Baghdad, especially during the first 16 hours. His dramatic reports often were accompanied by the sound of air raid sirens blaring and US bombs exploding in the background. Together with two other CNN journalists, Bernard Shaw and John Holliman, Arnett brought continuous coverage from Baghdad for the 16 initial intense hours of the war (17 January 1991). Although 40 foreign journalists were present at the Al-Rashid Hotel in Baghdad at the time, only CNN possessed the means — a private phone line connected to neighboring Amman, Jordan — to communicate to the outside world. CNN broadcast Arnett's extended call live for several hours, with a picture of Arnett as video. Soon the other journalists left Iraq, including the two CNN colleagues, which left Arnett as the sole remaining reporter.

His accounts of civilian damage caused by the bombing were not well received by the coalition war administration. Its spokesmen had emphasized terms such as "smart bombs" and "surgical precision" in their public statements, in an effort to project keeping civilian casualties would be at a minimum. White House sources would later attack Arnett, saying that he was being used as a tool for Iraqi disinformation.

Two weeks into the war, Arnett was able to obtain an exclusive, uncensored interview with Saddam Hussein. Due to Arnett's reporting from the "other side", for a period of five weeks, the Gulf War was the first to be broadcast live on TV.

About halfway through the war, representatives of the CIA approached Arnett. They believed that the Iraqi military was operating a high-level communication network from the basement of the Al Rashid Hotel, which is where Arnett and other staff from CNN were staying. The CIA wanted him out so the Air Force could bomb the hotel, but Arnett refused. He said he had been given a tour of the hotel and denied there was such a facility.

Interview with Osama Bin Laden
In March 1997, Arnett of CNN interviewed Osama bin Laden, leader of Al-Qaeda, after Bin Laden declared jihad on the United States. Asked by Arnett, "What are your future plans?", Bin Laden said, "You'll see them and hear about them in the media, God willing".

Operation Tailwind
In 1998, Arnett narrated a report on the joint venture (between CNN and Time magazine) program called NewsStand, covering "Operation Tailwind" in Laos in 1970.

The report, titled The Valley of Death, claimed that in 1970, the United States Army had used sarin, a nerve agent, against a group of deserting U.S. soldiers in Laos. The men who allegedly conducted the attack were an elite Green Berets A-Team.  The report was expressly approved by both CNN Chairman Tom Johnson and CNN President Rick Kaplan. In response, the Pentagon commissioned another report contradicting that of CNN's. CNN subsequently conducted its own investigation. It concluded that the "journalism [in the Valley of Death] was flawed" and retracted the story. While all 12 men of the Green Beret A-Team were wounded in action during Operation Tailwind, no sarin was involved.

Due to a number of rebuttals claiming the CNN report was flawed, three or more of the individuals responsible were fired or forced to resign. Arnett was reprimanded, and left the network in April 1999, apparently due to "lingering fallout" from Tailwind.

Invasion of Iraq 2003
On assignment for NBC and National Geographic, Arnett went to Iraq in 2003 to cover the U.S. invasion. After a press meeting there, he granted an interview to state-run Iraqi TV on 31 March 2003. In it he said:

Earlier in the interview he said:

When Arnett's remarks sparked a "firestorm of protest", NBC initially defended him, saying he had given the interview as a professional courtesy and that his remarks were "analytical in nature". A day later, though, NBC, MSNBC and National Geographic all severed their relationships with Arnett. In response to Arnett's statement on Iraqi TV, NBC stated:

Arnett responded:

Later that day, Arnett was hired by the British tabloid, The Daily Mirror, which had opposed the war. A couple of days later he also received work from Greek television channel NET television, and Belgian VTM.

Academic career

After retiring as a field reporter in 2007, Arnett lives in Los Angeles.

He also teaches journalism at Shantou University in China. In New Zealand, the Peter Arnett School of Journalism was named for him at the Southern Institute of Technology; the journalism school closed in 2015.

Personal life
In 1964, Arnett married Nina Nguyen, a Vietnamese woman. They had two children, Elsa and Andrew. Nina and Peter separated in 1983, divorced more than 20 years later, then reconciled in 2006.

Elsa Arnett attended Stuyvesant High School in New York and Harvard University. After graduating, she went into journalism, became a reporter, worked for several months on The Washington Post as an intern and then joined The Boston Globe. She worked with her father on his 1994 memoir about his reporting life. Elsa Arnett is married to former White House lawyer John Yoo.

In the 2007 New Year Honours, Arnett was appointed an Officer of the New Zealand Order of Merit, for services to journalism.

In popular culture
Peter Arnett appeared in Robert Wiener's book Live from Baghdad. He appeared as a character in the 2002 HBO film of the same name, where he was portrayed by actor Bruce McGill.

The book, as well as the film, features Arnett's work as part of Wiener's crew in Baghdad. Arnett joined the team as tensions between Iraq and the West were escalating toward an imminent military encounter. CNN sent Arnett to Baghdad because of his experience in covering military conflicts. Arnett was part of the live coverage beginning on 16 January 1991, the start of the Gulf War air campaign, where he and colleagues Bernard Shaw and John Holliman kept broadcasting from their Al-Rasheed Hotel room amid extensive aerial bombing by the Western Coalition forces.

Arnett's interview with Bin Laden in 1997 became the subject of the movie 'A War Story' produced for television. Arnett's role was played by John Leigh.

Selected works

 Live from the Battlefield: From Vietnam to Baghdad: 35 Years in the World's War Zones. New York: Simon & Schuster, 1994. 
 Saigon Has Fallen: A Wartime Recollection by the Pulitzer Prize-Winning Journalist. New York: Rosetta Books/Associated Press, 2015

See also
 CNN controversies
 List of New Zealand television personalities

References

Bibliography

External links

 
 Sully, François, "Associated Press' Peter Arnett testing the first flame thrower captured from the Vietcong in Vietnam", photograph; 8 December 1965. Copyright Healey Library, UMass Boston; via openvault.wgbh.org.
 

American television reporters and correspondents
American war correspondents
American war correspondents of the Vietnam War
War correspondents of the Vietnam War
1934 births
Living people
CNN people
People from Riverton, New Zealand
Pulitzer Prize for International Reporting winners
New Zealand television presenters
New Zealand emigrants to the United States
Officers of the New Zealand Order of Merit
People with acquired American citizenship
Ngāi Tahu people
20th-century American journalists
American male journalists